Handball Sport Verein Hamburg is a handball club from Germany, located in Hamburg. Currently, Handball Hamburg competes in the Handball-Bundesliga. The full name in German is Handball Sport Verein Hamburg e.V. but the club has traditionally been called HSV Handball, HSV Hamburg or simply HSV.

History
Handball Sport Verein Hamburg is a merger of the former handball clubs VfL Bad Schwartau and HSV Lübeck, which joined forces in 1999. In 2002, they were moved to Hamburg for growth and renamed. Although locally known as HSV Hamburg, the club is not part of the Hamburger Sportverein and has the right to use their logo and abbreviation for promotional purposes. The club notably won a EHF Champions League in 2013 and a Handball-Bundesliga in 2011. On 20 January 2016, their license was revoked due to irregularities and, as a result, Handball Hamburg was not authorized to participate in either the first or second handball Bundesliga in the 2016/17 season. As a result, the club was relaunched with a new coat of arms, colors and a new image, from HSV Hamburg to Handball Sport Verein Hamburg; although the official name remained unchanged. The club will return to the Handball-Bundesliga in the 2021–2022 season.

Crest, colours, supporters

Naming history

Club crest

Kits

Accomplishments
 Handball-Bundesliga:
 : 2011
2. Handball-Bundesliga:
: 2021
 DHB-Pokal:
 : 2006, 2010
 DHB-Supercup:
 : 2004, 2006, 2009, 2010
 EHF Champions League:
 : 2013
 EHF Cup Winner's Cup:
 : 2007

Team

Current squad
Squad for the 2022–23 season

Technical staff
 Head coach:  Torsten Jansen
 Assistant coach:  Blaženko Lacković
 Athletic Trainer:  Philipp Winterhoff
 Physiotherapist:  Christina Dressel
 Club doctor:  Dr. Daniel Briem

Transfers
Transfers for the 2023–24 season

Joining 
  Tomislav Severec (LB) (from  RK Nexe Našice)
  Zorán Ilić (RB) (from  Veszprém KC)

Leaving 
  Tobias Schimmelbauer (LW) 
  Nicolai Theilinger (RB)

Previous squads

EHF ranking

Former club members

Notable former players

  Johannes Bitter (2007–2016, 2021–)
  Matthias Flohr (2004–2016)
  Heiko Grimm (2008–2009)
  Chrischa Hannawald (2009)
  Pascal Hens (2003–2016)
  Torsten Jansen (2003–2015, 2016–2017)
  Thomas Knorr (2002–2007)
  Michael Kraus (2010–2013)
  Jürgen Müller (2007–2008)
  Arne Niemeyer (2008–2009)
  Adrian Pfahl (2013–2015)
  Jens Schöngarth (2019–2020)
  Kevin Schmidt (2014–2016)
  Stefan Schröder (2005–2019)
  Manuel Späth (2021–2022)
  Nicolai Theilinger (2021–)
  Jens Vortmann (2015–2016, 2021–)
  Adrian Wagner (1996–2003)
  Henning Wiechers (2005–2007)
  Enid Tahirović (2012)
  Andrej Kurchev (2002–2003)
  Andrej Siniak (2002–2005)
  Bruno Souza (2006–2008)
  Ilija Brozović (2015–2016)
  Davor Dominiković (2013–2015)
  Domagoj Duvnjak (2009–2014)
  Blaženko Lacković (2008–2014, 2017–2020)
  Igor Vori (2009–2013)
  Alois Mráz (2005–2006)
  Morten Bjerre (2003–2004)
  Marcus Cleverly (2013–2014)
  Allan Damgaard (2015–2016)
  Hans Lindberg (2007–2016)
  Casper Ulrich Mortensen (2015–2016, 2021–)
  Henrik Toft Hansen (2013–2015)
  Dener Jaanimaa (2015–2016)
  Bertrand Gille (2002–2012)
  Guillaume Gille (2002–2012)
  Kentin Mahé (2013–2015)
  Aron Rafn Eðvarðsson (2018–2020)
  Yoon Kyung-shin (2006–2008)
  Žarko Marković (2013–2014)
  Tormod Moldestad (1999–2003)
  Simen Muffetangen (1999–2003)
  Piotr Grabarczyk (2015–2016)
  Michał Jurecki (2007–2008)
  Krzysztof Lijewski (2005–2011)
  Marcin Lijewski (2008–2013)
  Maciej Majdziński (2015–2016)
  Alexandru Șimicu (2014–2015)
  Igor Lavrov (2005–2007)
  Dmitri Torgovanov (2007–2009)
  Azat Valiullin (2021–)
  Roman Pungartnik (2005–2007)
  Renato Vugrinec (2011–2012)
  Jon Belaustegui (2003–2005)
  Joan Cañellas (2013–2014)
  Petar Đorđić (2013–2015)
  Zoran Đorđić (2012)
  Branko Kokir (2005–2006)
  Draško Nenadić (2015–2017)
  Goran Stojanović (2002–2007)
  Stefan Terzić (2012–2013)
  Iwan Ursic (2006–2008)
  Dan Beutler (2011–2013)
  Oscar Carlén (2011–2013)
  Jonas Ernelind (2002–2004)
  Nicklas Grundsten (2008–2009)
  Andreas Nilsson (2012–2014)
  Fredrik Petersen (2012–2013)
  Johan Petersson (2015)
  Per Sandström (2006–2011)
  Tomas Svensson (2002–2005)
  Oleg Velyky (2008–2010)

Former coaches

References

External links
 Official website

German handball clubs
Sport in Hamburg
Hamburger SV
1999 establishments in Germany
Handball clubs established in 1999